Jared Young Sanders Sr. (January 29, 1869 – March 23, 1944) was an American journalist and attorney from Franklin, the seat of St. Mary Parish in south Louisiana, who served as his state's House Speaker (1900–1904), lieutenant governor (1904–1908), the 34th Governor (1908–1912), and U.S. representative (1917–1921). Near the end of his political career he was a part of the anti-Long faction within the Louisiana Democratic Party. Huey Pierce Long Jr., in fact had once grappled with Sanders in the lobby of the Roosevelt Hotel in New Orleans.

He married Ada Veronica Shaw on May 31, 1891, and they had one son, Jared Y. Sanders Jr. They divorced in 1912. Sanders remarried to Emma Dickinson in 1916.

Jared Y. Sanders died at Our Lady of the Lake Hospital in Baton Rouge on March 23, 1944.

Footnotes

References
 "Jared Young Sanders", A Dictionary of Louisiana Biography, Vol. 2 (1988), pp. 714–715
 
 Mary E. Sanders, "The Political Career of Jared Young Sandrs, 1892–1912", Master's thesis (1955), Louisiana State University.
 Miriam G. Reeves, Governors of Louisiana (1980)
 Robert Sobel and John Raimo, Biographical Directory of the Governors of the U.S. (1978)
 Congressional Quarterly's Guide to U.S. Elections, U.S. Senate elections from Louisiana, 1908, 1920, and 1926.
 State of Louisiana – Biography
 Membership in the Louisiana House of Representatives 1812 – 2008

External links
 Cemetery Memorial by La-Cemeteries
 Jared Young Sanders Papers at The Historic New Orleans Collection

1869 births
1944 deaths
American male journalists
American Presbyterians
Democratic Party governors of Louisiana
Lieutenant Governors of Louisiana
Louisiana lawyers
Democratic Party members of the Louisiana House of Representatives
Writers from Baton Rouge, Louisiana
People from Bogalusa, Louisiana
People from Morgan City, Louisiana
Speakers of the Louisiana House of Representatives
Tulane University alumni
Tulane University Law School alumni
Democratic Party members of the United States House of Representatives from Louisiana
People from Franklin, Louisiana
Burials in Louisiana